Platonia insignis, the sole species of the genus Platonia, is a tree of the family Clusiaceae native to South America in the humid forests of Brazil, Paraguay, parts of Colombia and northeast to Guyana; especially in Amazon Rainforest. Common names include bacuri (and numerous variant spellings thereof; bacurí, bacury, bakuri, pacuri, pakuri, pakouri, packoeri, pakoeri), maniballi, naranjillo and bacurizeiro.

There was a degree of nomenclatural confusion, caused by Moronobea esculenta. If that were validly published for this species the current name would be Platonia esculenta. It was established that Moronobea esculenta is not a formal name (not "validly published"), so the name remains Platonia insignis.

Platonia is related to Montrouziera from New Caledonia.

Description
Platonia insignis is a dry-season deciduous tree, reaching 25–40 m high. It has a pyramidal crown and copious yellow latex in the bark. The leaves are opposite, simple oblong to elliptic, 8–15 cm long, and glossy dark green, with wavy margins and a leathery texture.

The flowers are 5–7 cm long and pink in color, with five petals and numerous stamens. The fruit is round to oval and 7–14 cm long, with a thick, yellow skin. It resembles a papaya. The rind exudes a yellow latex when pressed. The sticky white pulp is fragrant, with a taste that is both sweet and sour. There are 3 to 5 seeds.

The white-bellied parrot (Pionites leucogaster) is a pollinator of the plant, making it ornithophilous.

Cultivation and uses

The bacuri is grown for its fruit, which is made into various condiments and beverages. It contains high levels of phosphorus, iron, and vitamin C. The oily brown seeds are used as a home remedy to treat skin conditions. Its yellowish wood is frequently used as timber.

Oil and butter

The grease of the bacuri oil has a high absorption rate, due to its high level of tripalmitin (50% to 55%), which penetrates the skin quickly. The high amount of fatty palmitoleic acid (5%), compared to other oils (less than or equal to 0.5 to 1.5%), makes the bacuri oil useful as an emollient and moisturizing agent.

Physico-chemical data

Chemistry
Platonia is a natural source of trioxygenated xanthones. The latex contains resinotol.

References

Bibliography

External links

Flora of the Venezuelan Guayana: Platonia

Clusiaceae
Monotypic Malpighiales genera
Trees of the Amazon
Trees of Brazil
Trees of Colombia
Trees of Guyana
Trees of Paraguay
Trees of Suriname
Tropical fruit
Crops originating from South America
Flora of northern South America
Taxa named by Carl Friedrich Philipp von Martius